The Hunter 19 (Europa) is a British sailboat that was designed by Oliver Lee and first built in 1972.

The design was originally marketed by the manufacturer as the Hunter 19, but is now usually referred to as the Hunter 19 (Europa) to differentiate it from the unrelated American Hunter Marine 1981 Hunter 19-1 and 1993 Hunter 19-2 designs, which were both also sold as the Hunter 19.

Production
The design was built by Hunter Boats Limited in the United Kingdom between 1972 and 1982, but it is now out of production.

Design
The Hunter 19 (Europa) is a development of the Squib, with a cabin added. After 1974 it was known as the Europa 19 or the Hunter Europa. It is a small recreational keelboat, built predominantly of fibreglass, with wood trim. It has a masthead sloop rig, a raked stem, a reverse transom, a transom-hung rudder controlled by a tiller and a fixed fin keel. It displaces  and carries  of fixed ballast.

The boat is optionally fitted with a small outboard motor for docking and maneuvering.

See also
List of sailing boat types

Similar sailboats
Buccaneer 200
Cal 20
Catalina 18
Drascombe Lugger
Edel 540
Hunter 18.5
Hunter 19-1
Mercury 18
Mistral T-21
Naiad 18
Paceship 20
Sandpiper 565
Sanibel 18
San Juan 21
Sirius 22
Typhoon 18

References

Keelboats
1970s sailboat type designs
Sailing yachts
Sailboat types built by Hunter Boats
Sailboat type designs by Oliver Lee